Boniface Mutinda Kabaka (January 1, 1966 – 11 December 2020) was a Kenyan politician who served as a Senator from Machakos County from 2017 until his death in 2020. He was a member of the Chama Cha Uzalendo party.

Kabaka was born on January 1, 1966, in Machakos County. He received several degrees from the University of Nairobi, including master's degrees in business administration, law, and diplomacy, and a PhD in finance law. He was elected to the Senate in 2017.

In late November 2020, Kabaka tested positive for COVID-19. He was also suffering from a blood clot in the head and on 4 December collapsed after complaining of a headache; he was rushed to The Nairobi Hospital in critical condition, suffering from a stroke, but died on 11 December. He was buried at his home in Mikuyuni village, Masinga in Machakos County.

References

1966 births
2020 deaths
Members of the Senate of Kenya
University of Nairobi alumni
Deaths from the COVID-19 pandemic in Kenya